Boršov nad Vltavou (until 1950 Boršov) is a municipality and village in České Budějovice District in the South Bohemian Region of the Czech Republic. It has about 2,000 inhabitants.

Administrative parts
Villages of Jamné, Poříčí and Zahorčice are administrative parts of Boršov nad Vltavou.

References

Villages in České Budějovice District